Gary John Speak (born 26 April 1962) is a former English cricketer.  Speak was a right-handed batsman who bowled right-arm fast-medium.  He was born at Chorley, Lancashire.
 
Speak made his first-class debut for Lancashire against the touring Sri Lankans in 1981.  He made a further appearance in the 1981 County Championship against Essex.  He made three further first-class appearances in 1982, against Cambridge University, Derbyshire and Surrey.  In his five first-class appearances, he bowled a total of 68 overs, taking just a single wicket, having conceded 230 runs.  With the bat, he scored 27 runs at a batting average of 13.50, with a high score of 15 not out.

References

External links
Gary Speak at ESPNcricinfo
Gary Speak at CricketArchive

1962 births
Living people
Sportspeople from Chorley
English cricketers
Lancashire cricketers